In physics, the Landau–Lifshitz equation (LLE), named for Lev Landau and Evgeny Lifshitz, is a name used for several different differential  equations 
For the Landau–Lifshitz aeroacoustic equation see aeroacoustics.
For the Landau–Lifshitz equation describing the precessional motion of magnetization M in a solid with an effective magnetic field H and with damping, see Landau–Lifshitz–Gilbert equation.
For the Landau–Lifshitz equation describing a magnetic field in  dimensions see Landau–Lifshitz model.
For the Landau-Lifshitz equation approximating the Abraham-Lorentz force.